Khawzawl district is one of the eleven districts of Mizoram state in India. Khawzawl district was recently created on 3 June 2019.

Toponymy
The district is named after its headquarters Khawzawl.

Divisions

The district has four Legislative Assembly constituencies. These are Champhai North, Hrangturzo, Lengteng and Tuichang. There are twenty eight inhabited towns and villages in this district. Khawzawl town itself has around 3,000 family residing in it. It is estimated that there are around 14,000 people residing in Khawzawl town.
Khawzawl district has around 7,372 families with 36,381 people residing in it.

Towns and villages
The main towns and villages in Khawzawl district are:
Aiduzawl
Arro
Chalrang
Chawngtlai
Chhawrtui
Demdum
Dilkawn
Dulte
Hmuncheng
Kawlkulh
Kelkang
Khawpuitan
Khuailui
Khualen
Lungtan
Melbuk-Khawnuam
Melhnih (Chalrang)
Mualkawi
Mualzen
Neihdawn
New Chalrang
Ngaizawl
Pamchung
Phunchawngzawl
Puilo
Rabung
Tlangmawi
Tualpui
Tualte
Tuipui
Vangtlang
Vankal
Zaupui
Zokhawthar

Climate
Khawzawl district has a moderate climate. In winter the temperature varies from 0 °C to 20 °C and in summer, the temperature varies between 15 °C and 30 °C.

Transport
The Distance between Khawzawl and Aizawl is 152 km .  Khawzawl is connected with regular service of Bus, sumo (Passenger vehicle) and helicopter.

Geography
The district is bounded on the north and west by Saitual district and on the south by Serchhip district, on the east  by Champhai district . Khawzawl district is the only district Mizoram that has no international boundaries and inter-state boundaries Khawzawl town is the administrative headquarters of the district.

References

 
Districts of Mizoram